Saint-Thonan is a commune in the Finistère department of Brittany in north-western France.

Population
Inhabitants of Saint-Thonan are called in French Saint-Thonanais.

See also
Communes of the Finistère department

References

Mayors of Finistère Association

External links

Official website 

Communes of Finistère